The Market Cart is a 1786 oil on canvas painting by the British artist Thomas Gainsborough. It is one of his final landscapes, painted about 18 months before his death and is now in the collection of the National Gallery in London, to which it was presented by the British Institution's governors in 1830.

Description

The painting depicts a horse-drawn cart, with two girls sat aboard, travelling along a woodland path. It was first exhibited at Gainsborough's own home in Pall Mall in 1786. He would later add a figure of a woodman gathering bundles of wood in 1787. William Dutt, in a book published in 1901, claimed that this painting depicted Gainsborough Lane, which later gave its name to part of the South East Area, Ipswich.

References

Landscape paintings by Thomas Gainsborough
1786 paintings
Collections of the National Gallery, London
Dogs in art
Horses in art